Kocaköy is a village  in Digor district of Kars Province, Turkey. The population of Kocaköy is 2362 as of 2011. 

The village's Armenian population was forcibly deported during the Turkish–Armenian War of 1920, and was replaced by people from Alagyaz, Armenia.

References

Populated places in Kars Province
Towns in Turkey
Digor District
Kurdish settlements in Turkey